Henri Plagnol (born February 11, 1961 in Paris) is a French politician who has served on the National Assembly. He represented the Val-de-Marne department, from 1997 to 2002, and again from 2007 to 2012. Throughout his legislature tenure, Plagnol has been affiliated with the Union for French Democracy, the Union for a Popular Movement and the Union of Democrats and Independents.

Plagnol served as deputy mayor of Saint-Maur-des-Fossés from 1997, and contested the office in 2008, after Jean-Louis Beaumont chose not to run for reelection. Plagnol remained mayor until 2014, when he lost reelection to Sylvain Berrios.

References

1961 births
Living people
Politicians from Paris
Union for French Democracy politicians
Union for a Popular Movement politicians
Union of Democrats and Independents politicians
Deputies of the 11th National Assembly of the French Fifth Republic
Deputies of the 12th National Assembly of the French Fifth Republic
Deputies of the 13th National Assembly of the French Fifth Republic
Deputies of the 14th National Assembly of the French Fifth Republic